"À vendre" is a short story by French author Guy de Maupassant, published in 1885.

History
À vendre is a short story written by Guy de Maupassant. It was first published in the newspaper Gil Blas on January 5, 1885, before being reprised in the Monsieur Parent collection.

Synopsis
While walking in the surrounds of Quimperlé, the narrator finds a pretty house for sale at the bottom of a narrow, round beach.

Publications
 Gil Blas, 1885
 Monsieur Parent - collection published in 1885 by the editor Paul Ollendorff
 Maupassant, contes et nouvelles, volume II, text established and annotated by Louis Forestier, Bibliothèque de la Pléiade, Éditions Gallimard, 1979

References

1885 short stories
Short stories by Guy de Maupassant
Works originally published in Gil Blas (periodical)